Taranagar is a city and a municipality in Churu district in the Indian state of Rajasthan, situated at 28° 41'N 75° 3'E, about 120 miles northeast of Bikaner. Taranagar was earlier known as Reni, named for the lady Rinkali who came here to live from Vishalnagar Koyalapatan, currently Foga in Sardarshar (Rajasthan). Reni was the headquarters of the nizamat and the tehsil of the same name in the state of Bikaner in Rajputana. The nizamat consisted of five eastern tehsils of Bhadra, Churu, Nohar, Rajgarh and Reni. In 1948, the town was renamed for King Tara Singh, who ruled it in the mid-18th century.

Places of interest and importance

Taranagar is well known for its antiquity. It has a famous Jain temple built-in 942. It has very old statues of Jain Tirthankars. The Chhatri of Anand Singhji and Tara Singhji, or saints' homes, are quite popular. These are 2 km distant from the town.

A temple, a little away from the town, is known as Shyam Pandia. It is said to be as old as Dvapara Yuga. As the legend goes, it is believed that Bhima of The Mahabharata fame was sent here to call for the services or blessings of the then pujari of the temple, Saint Shyam Pandia, for the Tilak ceremony of Yudhishthira after the Battle of Kurukshetra was won by Pandavas.

Apart from private hospitals and practicing doctors, Taranagar has a referral hospital set up by late Onkar Mal Mintri and run by the state government where health care facilities are available for the general public and for the people from nearby villages. There is another hospital building that has been converted into a veterinary hospital catering to cattle.

Though the town does not have a railway station, it is well connected by road. It is served by roadway organization of many states, private buses, and taxi operators. Gandhi Upwan, in the east of the town, close to the bus stand and police station, is a moderate garden maintained by the municipality. There is a rest-house used by visiting officials that is run by Rajasthan state PWD. The same locality houses the famous Govt. Higher Secondary School, Taranagar.

A public library is almost in the middle of the Taranagar that also houses a free reading room, that over the decades has helped the growth of local intellect even if the facilities have been meager and maintenance falls short of needs; nonetheless, it has been providing a space for developing minds.

Since last decade or so Taranagar has been emerging as a place counted in its vicinity of its surrounding villages — for providing facilities for children's education, selling their produce, shopping, trade, institutional interaction, etc. Besides the Main Bazar that is in the center of town, there are a number of shop-clusters or markets specializing in merchandise like footwear, vegetables and fruits, medicines etc. There are some trading firms, bank branches, organizations, government offices. Almost a dozen institutions impart graduate courses including an upcoming veterinary medical college providing the feel of a self-sufficient town. Taranagar boasts an industrial estate promoted by RIICO primarily for the manufacture of plaster of Paris.

Nearby cities and villages

Sadulpur (also known as Rajgarh, its connecting railway station), a junction on the Northern Zone of Indian Railways is on east side at a distance of about 36 km and Churu, the district city is on its south side at a distance of about 60 km while Sardarsahar is on its south-west side. Apart from these cities, the town is surrounded by a large number of villages (124 )on all sides that are populated by mostly by small to medium-sized land holders, farmers and artisans. The town of Taranagar is used by them as a Mandi for selling their agricultural product as also a center for education, health services and connectivity. The nearby villages include Dhani- kumharan, Satyu, Rajpura, Lunas, Gajuwas, Chalkoi, Kharatwas, Nethawa, Togawas, Bhaleri, Bhanin, Kalwas, Dabri Chhoti, Dheerwas Bara, Sahwa, Bain, Buchawas, Dadrewa, Jigsana, Nyangli, Hadiyal, Dudhwa Khara, Bhamara etc. Brahmanwasi is an agricultural locality situated on the western side of the town. The main crops raised in the area are millets, bajra, guar, gram and lately even mustard. Historically, it was a zamindari that was initially vested in the Vyas family (Pushkarna Brahmins) by the late Raja Shri Joravar Singhji, the then ruler of a princely state of Bikaner. The current scion of the family Mool Raj holds the original handwritten document of transfer of Brahmanwasi. Vyas was further patronized by the vaishya community mainly Swetambar Jains, who held a prominent position in business and commerce. Goga Medi in Degawas Mohalla is also a famous temple built 50 years ago by  Pujari Shree Bihari Lal Ji Sankholia, where a fair is held on the occasion of Goga Navmi. More prominent of fairs held in the town include Ramdevji Ka Mela, where cattle are sold and the Gaur Magaria, a festival when a procession of Gaurajja is taken out with a lot of fanfare.

Geography
It has an average elevation of 232 meters (761 feet). A part of Thar desert, it experiences extremities of climate both in summer and in the winter, that are however considered good for build-up of immunities, for general health.

Town is located in the tehsil by the same name, under the Rajgarh subdivision of the Churu district. Historically, even the city of Churu used to be a part of Taranagar Tehsil. The town grew with its Mohallas (or localities) earmarked for different castes (that is to say known by caste names) that are even today referred to for the ease of practical identification but is officially now divided into different numerical wards for the postal, election or voting purposes.

Demographics
 India Census, Taranagar had a population of 2,11,831 out of which the urban population is 32,640 while the rural population is 1,79,191. Males constitute 52% of the population and females 48%. Taranagar has an average literacy rate of 57.06%, lower than the national average of 59.5%: male literacy is 66.85%, and female literacy is 46.45%. 18% of the population is under 6 years of age. Despite its moderate size, the town boasts of the cosmopolitan nature of its populace that comprises a diversity of castes, creeds, religions and regional inhabitants as also its diaspora spread over the various nooks and corners of different states of the country as also abroad. The composition of this diaspora is also quite varied and comprises industrialists, traders, businessmen, professionals, social workers and others. One person from the town, Late Sri Ram Krishna Sarawagi (son of a reputed disciple of Mahatma Gandhi late Sri Tulsiram Sarawagi) rose to become a minister in the state of West Bengal in the 1970s.Shree Shivraj Singh Kavia's in laws house is located near Shree Karani ji temple in this city.

Industry
Taranagar is known for its plaster of Paris industry, wooden items handicraft, jewelry, and education. Students of the nearby districts and tehsils are coming here to get a better and qualitative education from its educational institutions.

References

External links
 Taranagar official website
 Imperial Gazetteer of India, v. 21, p. 278

 https://www.bharatibiz.com/en/sudarshan-sabalaniya-094613-29154

Cities and towns in Churu district